Herrickiceras is an ammonite from the Upper Cretaceous which belongs to the Coilopoceratidae, a family within the superfamily Acanthoceratoidea. Herrickiceras has an established range in the Middle Turonian of the Upper Cretaceous. Its distribution is widespread, from western North America through Central Africa and the Middle East.
 
Species include:
H. costatum (type species)

References

The Paleobiology Database - Herrickiceras entry accessed 2 December 2011

Ammonitida genera
Acanthoceratoidea
Cretaceous ammonites
Cretaceous animals of Africa